Park Ji-yoon (Hangul: 박지윤; Hanja: 朴志胤; born January 3, 1982) is a South Korean singer, actress, and model. As a teen model, she gained wide exposure after starring in a Haitai biscuit commercial in 1994, and held a minor role in the television drama Dinosaur Teacher that same year. Her debut studio album, Skyblue Dream, was released in 1997. Park's early career under Taewon Entertainment saw the hit singles "Skyblue Dream", "Steal Away", "Precious Love" and "Don't Know Anything", and she was associated with a charming and fresh image.

In 2000, Park signed with JYP Entertainment and released her fourth album, Coming-of-Age Ceremony. She attracted attention for her provocative transformation, and the album's lead single of the same name became a defining hit for her. She released two further albums with JYP before going on a six-year hiatus in 2003.

Park received her BA from Kyunghee University in Postmodern Music, and holds an MA from Kyunghee University in Entertainment and Culture.

Career
After debuting as a commercial model at the age of 13, Park released her first studio album in 1997, titled Skyblue Dream. Her hit singles "Skyblue Dream" from her debut album, "Coming-of-Age Ceremony" from her fourth full-length album, and "I'm a Man" from Man, received a lot of love from fans.

However, due to creative differences, Park left JYP Entertainment after her sixth studio album Woo~ Twenty One; she felt that instead of showing her true self as an artist, she was being controlled by producer Park Jin-young. Park then took an extended break from singing and entered the film and musical fields.

Six years later, Park returned with her seventh studio album, Flower, Again for the First Time. Leaving behind her sexy image from "Coming-of-Age Ceremony", Park attempted to put her experiences of being in her 20s into this album, writing three of the songs on it and having creative input in producing the album as well as providing her own photography for the album design. She made her comeback with the song "In My Fading Memory" on MBC's Show! Music Core, and SBS's Inkigayo. The song was written and produced by Kim Yong-rin from Dear Cloud.

Park's eighth studio album, Tree of Life was released on February 16, 2012. Receiving positive reviews, Park collaborated again with Kim Yong-rin. She also worked with Mate's Jung Jun-il, and No Reply's Kwon Soon-kwan. Park wrote many tracks on this album; "At That Time", "Afternoon", "The Road to You", "Star", and "Quiet Dream". As with her previous work, Park contributed artistically through the photography on Tree of Life, collaborating on the album art once again with her older sister, who is a graphic designer. The song "The Road to You" was featured on the Korean trailer for the Hollywood movie, My Week with Marilyn starring Michelle Williams.

Park joined entertainment company Mystic89, and made her comeback in late October 2013. Her first digital singles released through Mystic89 is Mr., which was produced by Primary and "Witness", which was produced by Yoon Jong-shin. Mystic89 and Park plan to release several mini albums, collaborating with top producers and writers. The music will be a varying blend of several genres. Her new album was Mystic company was commercially successful. The title song ranked No. 1 on Korean music release chart such as Naver Music and Daum Music when it was released.

After the minialbum with Mystic company, Park came back to her own "Park Ji Yoon Creative" to focus more on her career as a songwriter instead of as a dance singer. She released her ninth album "Park Ji Yoon 9" on March 2, 2017. The album contains ten songs, eight of them composed by herself. This album is more in line with her seventh and eighth album and uses classic instruments.

Personal life 

On April 22, 2019, Park married Kakao’s co-CEO Jo Soo Yong a month prior. On January 20, 2021, Park revealed in an Instagram post that she has given birth to her first child, a daughter.

Philanthropy 
On September 6, 2022, Park donated  to help those affected by the due to heavy rain and typhoon through The Hope Bridge Korea Disaster Relief Association.

Discography

Studio albums

Compilation and live albums

Singles

Other charted songs

Soundtrack appearances

Filmography

Film

Television series

Television show

Awards and nominations

Mnet Asian Music Awards

References

External links
 Park Ji-yoon's official website
 Park Ji-yoon's profile at EPG

1982 births
Living people
JYP Entertainment artists
K-pop singers
MAMA Award winners
Mystic Entertainment artists
Folk-pop singers
South Korean female idols
South Korean women pop singers
South Korean film actresses
South Korean television actresses
21st-century South Korean singers
21st-century South Korean women singers